Heaven Music is an independent record label in Athens, Greece, founded in 2001 by ANT1 Group. It is known for signing new and young artists.

Overview
During its first five years of operation under the control of George Levendis, Heaven Music was credited with certifications of a four-time platinum album, three double platinum albums, five platinum albums and twenty-four gold albums, as well as one double platinum, one platinum and eight golden CD-singles.

Heaven had an exclusive contract with the songwriter Phoebus since the company's founding until he left in late 2009. He is well known in Greece and Cyprus for his work with many popular singers and having produced several multi-platinum albums.

Heaven has shown a pattern of interest in new and young singers. It cooperated with parent company's talent show Fame Story, the Greek version of the Star Academy franchise, and signed several of its contestants.

Heaven has worked to promote its artists outside of Greece. In 2002, Heaven began a collaboration with the Ministry of Sound, a leading dance label in Europe, exposing Despina Vandi's album Gia, which was already certified multi-platinum in Greece, across Europe and North America.

Heaven Music also has a digital distribution deal with several national iTunes Stores, as well as with other Greek digital download retailers.

As of March 2014, Heaven Music is the distributor of music recordings from Warner Music Group for Greek and Cypriot market.

Artists
The following artists are signed to Heaven Music .

Themis Adamantidis
Dimitris Basis
Chrispa
Rallia Christidou
Giorgos Daskoulidis
Kim Diamantopoulos
Angela Dimitriou
Angelos Dionysiou
Stelios Dionysiou
Gianna Fafaliou
Dimitra Galani
Giorgos Giannias
Nikos Halkousis
Kostas Haritodiplomenos
Michalis Hatzigiannis
Tasos Ioannidis
Kalomira
Kon Cept
Stratos Karalis
Haris Kostopoulos
Nikos Kourkoulis
George P. Lemos
Kostas Makedonas
Sofia Manou
Christina Maragkozi
Kostas Martakis
Christos Menidiatis
Nikiforos
Despina Olympiou
Lefteris Pantazis
Filippos Pliatsikas
Alkistis Protopsalti
Stella Samara
Villi Razi
Riskykidd
Angela Sidiropoulou
Natasa Theodoridou
Valando Tryfonos
Michalis Tzouganakis
Nikos Vertis
Walkman the Band
Peggy Zina
Apostolia Zoi
Nikos Zoidakis
Amaryllis
El Dominicano

References

External links
Official website

 
ANT1 Group
Pop record labels
Record labels established in 2001